Monster Brawl is a 2011 independent Canadian horror comedy film.

Plot

The film depicts a wrestling-style fight to the death set inside an abandoned and cursed graveyard, shown in a pay-per-view style atmosphere. The fighters are eight classic movie monsters – Cyclops, Swamp Gut, Frankenstein's Monster, Lady Vampire, Werewolf, Mummy, Witch Bitch and Zombie Man. Acting as play-by‐play announcer is Buzz Chambers (Dave Foley) with color commentating by former champ Sasquatch Sid (Art Hindle). The Brawl itself is divided into two classes: The Creature class and the Undead class. For the Creatures: Cyclops, Werewolf, Witch Bitch and Swamp Gut. For the Undead: Lady Vampire, Zombie Man, The Mummy and Frankenstein. Each round is preceded by the origin of the combatants. For the first round, Cyclops, revealed to have received a message of the tournament goes to prove himself to the world and eventually to crush Hades who had cursed him with his foreseeing eye, while Witch Bitch is recruited by a diminutive troll named Grub who is a renowned monster combat trainer to overcome her small village's hatred of her through fear and dominance. As their combat starts off, Cyclops clearly has the advantage, but Witch Bitch is tenacious and fights viciously. As the combat ensues, she attempts to slam and pin the Cyclops down, her efforts leading to an illegal move called by the referee. Cyclops counters her attacks by bringing out a small mallet to brutally bludgeon her. Her retaliation is by whipping out a carving knife and attacking, inadvertently slashing the ref's throat in the process. She tries to blind Cyclops, but he turns his legendary optic beam on her, melting her face clean off and killing her. Outraged by the loss, Grub attempts to attack the Cyclops, only to be decapitated in a single punch. Cyclops stands as winner for round one.
 
Round two faces off the mummy, who was the subject of a national search when he escaped from his crate at a museum and killed the loading dock worker there, while Lady Vampire is hunted in her mysterious home by a man who tries to gun her down, only to be bitten and chased off in fear. Mummy has the advantage of no blood or feeling to the vampire's throws and attacks. He out-muscles most of her attacks and keeps on coming, he blinds her and knocks her out with a sleeper hold. But when he goes to get a wooden stake and bring it back, she revives and continues to wail on him. He has a brief advantage with his magical amulet that harnesses the power of the sun, burning half of Lady Vampire's face. But she throws him from the ring, separating him from his amulet, after hitting him with a tombstone, she punches him through his chest, ripping out his black heart and killing him. She is declared the winner of the Undead lightweight round. The third round, featuring the heavyweight combatants Werewolf and Swamp Gut, they are preceded by the Werewolf's story, having witnessed his wife's death at the hands of a werewolf, he goes out in search to kill him. However, the werewolf attacks and bites him, cursing him even though he manages to finish the wolf off. He is smarmy and sarcastic and viciously self-confident with the advantage of the full moon showing that night. Swamp Gut's story is portrayed as a documentary where, like a crocodile he hunts unassuming victims in his swamps, paralyzing them with his toxic spit and devouring them. As the match starts, Werewolf proves little effectiveness in his body slams due to Swamp Gut's girth, but his agility keeps him one step ahead as he attacks the gut's weak spot, his stomach. Sid makes reference to King Hippo of Punch Out in comparison to the battle. Werewolf's blows weaken his opponent who collapses to the ring. He does a dive from the corner onto Swamp Gut, causing his stomach to explode, killing him. Werewolf is the king of the creature heavyweight championship and moves on to the final match. The second match is between Frankenstein and Zombie Man, Frankenstein's life beginning after a German doctor's attempts to reanimate the dead are successful, he calls his creator 'father' and has an emotional attachment to him immediately, while Zombie Man, a kidnapped government experiment at the ultimate soldier is trained specifically for this tournament. Colonel Crookshank sacrifices men to feed the zombie's appetite for human flesh and earn trust. As the pair match off, Zombie Man is much faster than Frankenstein, but his bites are ineffective. The pair match blow for blow, but much to his father's disdain, Frankenstein does not realize he needs to destroy Zombie Man's head. As the doctor climbs into the ring and attacks Zombie Man with a wrench, Crookshank does the same and kills the doctor with a hatchet to the back. This enrages Frankenstein who brutally attacks Zombie Man, eventually crushing his skull with his foot. In his death throes, Zombie Man summons up a horde of six zombies, one of which bites Sid in the booth before they combine their efforts and attack Crookshank before the caretaker kills them all. The final match is between Werewolf and Frankenstein, Sid slowly loses his composure and becomes a zombie during the round, forcing Buzz to kill him. Meanwhile, Werewolf is at a severe disadvantage with the towering undead. His blows don't phase Frankenstein, who, despite having his leg practically torn off in a figure four hold from the Werewolf manages to beat him into submission by crushing his skull with his hands. Frankenstein starts to walk away the victor but Werewolf recovers, attacking him more viciously, taking several tombstones and crushing them over Frankenstein's head. He takes the belt for himself, but Frankenstein wakes and attacks the unaware werewolf, grabbing his jowls before ripping his head apart. Finally victorious, Frankenstein takes his hard-earned belt and starts to leave. But Crookshank, now a sentient zombie challenges him to a fight. Both men standing at even height and muscle they start to wield a mighty blow at one another when the screen freezes and goes dark.
 
In a post-credit scene, Jimmy Hart is speaking on the phone while a zombie walks behind him grabs and pull him under the ring.

Cast
Dave Foley as Buzz Chambers
Art Hindle as "Sasquatch" Sid Tucker
Robert Maillet as Frankenstein
Kevin Nash as Colonel Crookshank
Lance Henriksen as the Narrator
Jimmy Hart as Himself
Herb Dean as Himself
 Jason David Brown as Cyclops / Swamp Gut / Cyril Haggard
 Kelly Couture as Lady Vampire
 R.J. Skinner as Werewolf / Mummy (King Khafra)
 Rico Montana as Zombie Man
Holly Letkeman as Witch Bitch
John Geddes as Lieutenant Briggs
Mark Gibson as Agent Dunn
Christopher Goddard as Sheriff
Jason Deline as Jacob Blackburn
 Jesse T. Cook as the Village Drunk
 Ashley Byford as Blonde Ring Girl
 Rachelle Corbeil as Black-haired Ring Girl
Ari Millen as Dr. Igora
Chris Rutte as The Grub
Matt Wiele as The Messenger
Janet Dee as Bucket Fanny

Production
The film was shot in Collingwood, Ontario.

Release

The film was premiered at the 2011 Fantasia Film Festival and was chosen as the Opening Gala Film at the 2011 Toronto After Dark Film Festival.

References

External links

Official Fan Hub

Canadian comedy horror films
Canadian independent films
Canadian monster movies
2011 films
Canadian action horror films
Canadian vampire films
Canadian werewolf films
Canadian zombie comedy films
English-language Canadian films
Films about witchcraft
Frankenstein films
Mummy films
Films shot in Ontario
2010s exploitation films
Canadian splatter films
2010s English-language films
2010s Canadian films